Oscar Raúl Wirth Lafuente (born 5 November 1955) is a Chilean football manager and former football goalkeeper who played for Cobreloa (Chile), Rot-Weiß Oberhausen (West Germany), and Real Valladolid (Spain) during his professional career.

International career
Wirth represented Chile at the 1982 FIFA World Cup, wearing the number one jersey. For Chile he played 12 matches, making his debut on 24 June 1980 in a friendly against Brazil. In addition, he made appearances for the B-team in the friendly tournament 1985 Indonesian Independence Cup, where Chile became champion.

Managerial career
After working for Universidad Católica in the B-team and as the goalkeeping coach of Cobreloa, he joined the technical staff of Juvenal Olmos in the Chile national team. During 2011 he was the head coach of Iberia in the Chilean Tercera A and next he worked in the yout team of Audax Italiano.

After steps with Chile U20, women and men, between 2017 and 2021, he assumed as the Sport Director of Cobreloa for the 2022 season.

Personal life
His father, Fernando, was a defender who played for Santiago Morning and his older brother, Erwin, took part of Chile at under-20 level in the 1971 South American Championship. His children are also athletes since his son, Rainer, is a former professional footballer who played as a goalkeeper and his daughter, Beatriz, is a Chile international field hockey goalkeeper.

Honours
Universidad Católica
 Chilean Segunda División (1): 1975

Colo-Colo
 Chilean Primera División (1): 1979

Cobreloa
 Chilean Primera División (2): 1980, 1982

Chile
 Indonesian Independence Cup (1):

References

External links
 
 Oscar Wirth at CeroaCero 
 Oscar Wirth at playerhistory

1955 births
Living people
Chilean people of German descent
Footballers from Santiago
Chilean footballers
Chilean expatriate footballers
Chile international footballers
1982 FIFA World Cup players
1979 Copa América players
1989 Copa América players
Chilean Primera División players
Primera B de Chile players
Club Deportivo Universidad Católica footballers
Colo-Colo footballers
Cobreloa footballers
Everton de Viña del Mar footballers
Universidad de Chile footballers
Deportes La Serena footballers
Deportes Concepción (Chile) footballers
2. Bundesliga players
Rot-Weiß Oberhausen players
La Liga players
Real Valladolid players
Categoría Primera A players
Independiente Medellín footballers
Peruvian Primera División players
Club Alianza Lima footballers
Chilean expatriate sportspeople in Germany
Chilean expatriate sportspeople in Spain
Chilean expatriate sportspeople in Colombia
Chilean expatriate sportspeople in Peru
Expatriate footballers in Germany
Expatriate footballers in Spain
Expatriate footballers in Colombia
Expatriate footballers in Peru
Association football goalkeepers
Chilean football managers
Deportes Iberia managers